Julien Rybacki (born 24 September 1995) is a German footballer currently playing for TVD Velbert.

References

External links
 

1995 births
Living people
German footballers
Association football forwards
MSV Duisburg players
2. Bundesliga players
3. Liga players
VfB Homberg players
Footballers from Duisburg